PKP Informatyka is a company of PKP Group responsible for supplying Polish railroad operators with IT technology.

The company was founded after dividing Polskie Koleje Państwowe (national rail operator) into several dozens companies to meet European Union Standards.

See also 
 Transportation in Poland
 List of railway companies
 Polish locomotives designation
 PKP Group

References

Railway companies of Poland
PKP Group companies